Thomas Grimston Estcourt (1775–1853), of New Park, near Devizes, Wiltshire, later known as Thomas Grimston Bucknall Estcourt, was an English politician.

He was MP for Devizes
23 January 1805 – February 1826 and for Oxford University 22 February 1826 – 1847.

After the death of his uncle, Harbottle Bucknall, rector of Pebmarsh, Essex, in early 1823, under the will of John Askell Bucknall, who had died in 1796, Estcourt inherited the estate of Oxhey, Hertfordshire,  The will obliged him to take the name of Bucknall, he swiftly obtained permission to add his former surname to it, and was afterwards known as Bucknall Estcourt.

Family
Estcourt married Eleanor Sutton, daughter of James Sutton. Their sons were:

T. H. S. Sotheron-Estcourt, eldest son.
James Bucknall Bucknall Estcourt was their second son.
Edmund Hiley Bucknall Estcourt
Walter Grimston Bucknall Estcourt R.N. (1807–1845) was their fourth son.
William John Bucknall Estcourt
Edward Dugdale Bucknall Estcourt

Their daughters were Eleanor Anne, Georgina Charlotte (died young) and Mary Anne Harriet.

References

1775 births
1853 deaths
People from Devizes
UK MPs 1802–1806
UK MPs 1806–1807
UK MPs 1807–1812
UK MPs 1812–1818
UK MPs 1818–1820
UK MPs 1820–1826
UK MPs 1826–1830
UK MPs 1830–1831
UK MPs 1831–1832
UK MPs 1832–1835
UK MPs 1835–1837
UK MPs 1837–1841
UK MPs 1841–1847
Members of the Parliament of the United Kingdom for English constituencies
Members of the Parliament of the United Kingdom for the University of Oxford